The Sigaren Islands are two islands lying in the east part of Lutzow-Holm Bay, 3.5 miles (6 km) west of Langhovde-kita Point. The islands were mapped by Norwegian cartographers from air photos taken by the Lars Christensen Expedition, 1936–37, and named Sigaren (the cigar) because of their shape.

See also 
 List of antarctic and sub-antarctic islands

Islands of Queen Maud Land
Prince Harald Coast